Jeff Farrington is an American football coach.  He is the head football coach at North Greenville University, a position he has held since 2013.

Head coaching record

References

External links
 North Greenville profile

Year of birth missing (living people)
Living people
East Carolina Pirates football coaches
East Tennessee State Buccaneers football coaches
Florida State Seminoles football coaches
Furman Paladins football coaches
Lenoir–Rhyne Bears football coaches
Mercer Bears football coaches
North Greenville Crusaders football coaches
Presbyterian Blue Hose football coaches
The Citadel Bulldogs football players
The Citadel Bulldogs football coaches
VMI Keydets football coaches
West Georgia Wolves football coaches